Dumbutu (also called Dumbuttu or Dumbuto) is a village in the Gambia and it is located in the Lower River Division.

References

 

Populated places in the Gambia